Ticket of Leave is a 1936 British crime film directed by Michael Hankinson and starring Dorothy Boyd, John Clements and George Merritt. It was made as a quota quickie at British and Dominions Elstree Studios by the British subsidiary of Paramount Pictures. The screenplay concerns a woman who joins forces with a criminal after he robs her flat. The title refers to the ticket of leave given to prisoners when they were released from jail.

Cast
 Dorothy Boyd as Lillian Walters  
 John Clements as Lucky Fisher  
 George Merritt as Inspector Black  
 Max Kirby as Goodman  
 Wally Patch as Sergeant Knott  
 Enid Lindsey as Edith Groves  
 J. Neil More as Sir Richard Groves  
 Molly Hamley-Clifford as Old Rose

References

Bibliography
Chibnall, Steve. Quota Quickies: The Birth of the British 'B' Film. British Film Institute, 2007.
 Low, Rachael. Filmmaking in 1930s Britain. George Allen & Unwin, 1985.
Wood, Linda. British Films, 1927–1939. British Film Institute, 1986.

External links

1936 films
1936 crime films
British crime films
Films directed by Michael Hankinson
Quota quickies
Films produced by Anthony Havelock-Allan
British black-and-white films
British and Dominions Studios films
Films shot at Imperial Studios, Elstree
1930s English-language films
1930s British films